Charlie Bass may refer to:

 Charles Bass (born 1952), American politician
 Charlie Bass (engineer), American engineer and co-founder of Ungermann-Bass
 Charles C. Bass (1875–1975), American medical doctor and researcher